(born May 23, 1975) is a Japanese professional wrestler, mostly known for his ring name Mazada (written in all capitals). He is one of the founding members of the renowned stable Tokyo Gurentai along with Nosawa Rongai and Kikuzawa.

Championships and accomplishments
All Japan Pro Wrestling
AJPW Junior Tag League (2006) - with Nosawa Rongai
Apache Army
WEW Tag Team Championship (1 time) - with Nosawa Rongai
Dradition Pro Wrestling
CAW Central United States Tag Team Championship (1 time) - with Katsushi Takemura
Dramatic Dream Team
UWA World Trios Championship (2 times) - with Nosawa Rongai and Fujita
El Dorado Wrestling
UWA World Tag Team Championship (1 time) - with Nosawa Rongai
International Wrestling Revolution Group
IWRG Intercontinental Tag Team Championship (2 times) - with Nosawa (1) and American Gigolo (1)
IWRG Intercontinental Trios Championship (1 time) - with Nosawa and Takemura
Copa Higher Power (2004) - with Nosawa Rongai, Garuda and Black Tiger III
Mobius
Apex of Triangle Six–Man Tag Team Championship (1 time) - with Nosawa Rongai and Takemura
Pro Wrestling Illustrated
PWI ranked him #277 of the best 500 singles wrestlers in the PWI 500 in 2006
Tokyo Gurentai
Tokyo Intercontinental Tag Team Championship (3 times) – with HUB (1) and Fujita (1), Dick Togo (1)
Tokyo World Heavyweight Championship (1 time)
Tokyo World Tag Team Championship (1 time) - with Nosawa Rongai
Wrestle-1
Wrestle-1 Cruiser Division Championship (2 times)

References

1975 births
Japanese male professional wrestlers
Living people
Sportspeople from Fukui Prefecture
20th-century professional wrestlers
21st-century professional wrestlers
UWA World Trios Champions
UWA World Tag Team Champions
Wrestle-1 Cruiser Division Champions
WEW World Tag Team Champions